Charles Arnulf (16 November 1892 – 1 March 1958) was a French racing cyclist. He rode in the 1923 Tour de France.

References

1892 births
1958 deaths
French male cyclists
Place of birth missing